Kaarle (Kalle) Myllylä (14 September 1844 – 11 July 1923) was a Finnish farmer and politician, born in Kalajoki. He was a member of the Diet of Finland from 1897 to 1899 and again from 1905 to 1906 and of the Parliament of Finland from 1907 to 1910, representing the Finnish Party.

References

1844 births
1923 deaths
People from Kalajoki
People from Oulu Province (Grand Duchy of Finland)
Finnish Party politicians
Members of the Diet of Finland
Members of the Parliament of Finland (1907–08)
Members of the Parliament of Finland (1908–09)
Members of the Parliament of Finland (1909–10)